Hagino (written: 萩野) is a Japanese surname. Notable people with the surname include:

, Japanese footballer
, Japanese footballer
, Japanese swimmer
, Japanese actor

See also
12802 Hagino, a main-belt asteroid
Hagino Station, a railway station in Shiraoi District, Hokkaidō, Japan

Japanese-language surnames